Asia Eastern University of Science and Technology (OIT) is a private college in Banqiao District, New Taipei, Taiwan and was originally known as the Far East College of Engineering and Technology. It was later renamed Asia University of Science and Technology in 2001 and then again to its current name, Asia Eastern University of Science and Technology, in 2018.

AEU offers a wide range of undergraduate and graduate programs in fields such as engineering, computer science, business, management, design, and humanities.

History
OIT was founded in 1968 as Oriental Academy of Industrial Technology. In 1973, the academy was renamed Oriental Academy of Industry and consisted of four departments. In 2000, it was restructured to become Oriental Institute of Technology and its two-year college was established. In 2001, it established its four-year college. On 1 August 2021, it was renamed to Asia Eastern University of Science and Technology after approved by the Ministry of Education.

Faculties
 College of Engineering
 College of Healthcare and Management
 College of Information and Communication Science

Transportation
OIT is accessible within walking distance south from Far Eastern Hospital Station of the Taipei Metro.

See also
 List of universities in Taiwan

References

External links

 

1968 establishments in Taiwan
Educational institutions established in 1968
Universities and colleges in New Taipei
Scientific organizations based in Taiwan
Universities and colleges in Taiwan
Technical universities and colleges in Taiwan
Banqiao District